"¿Y cómo es él?" (Spanish for And what is he like?) is a song composed in 1981 by José Luis Perales and released in 1982.

The song was originally composed for Julio Iglesias and it has been covered by Raphael among others. In 2010, American singer Marc Anthony covered "¿Y cómo es él?" on his album Iconos. It was released as the lead single from the album and peaked at number 38 on the Hot Latin Songs chart. Anthony and Perales performed the song together live at the 11th Annual Latin Grammy Awards in 2010.

References 

1982 singles
Songs written by José Luis Perales
2010 singles
Marc Anthony songs
1981 songs
José Luis Perales songs
Latin ballads
Song recordings produced by Julio Reyes Copello